The 1960 Cincinnati Reds season consisted of the Reds finishing in sixth place in the National League standings, with a record of 67–87, 28 games behind the National League and World Series champion Pittsburgh Pirates.

The Reds were managed by Fred Hutchinson and played their home games at Crosley Field and attracted 664,486 customers, eighth and last in the league.

Offseason 
 November 21, 1959: Tom Acker was traded by the Reds to the Kansas City Athletics for Frank House.
 December 6, 1959: Frank Thomas was traded by the Reds to the Chicago Cubs for Lee Walls, Lou Jackson, and Bill Henry.
 December 15, 1959: Johnny Temple was traded by the Reds to the Cleveland Indians for Billy Martin, Gordy Coleman and Cal McLish.
 March 12, 1960: Tony Pérez was signed as an amateur free agent by the Reds.
 Prior to 1960 season: Jesse Gonder was acquired from the Cincinnati Reds by the New York Yankees.

Regular season

Season standings

Record vs. opponents

Notable transactions 
 June 15, 1960: Tony González and Lee Walls were traded by the Reds to the Philadelphia Phillies for Wally Post, Harry Anderson, and Fred Hopke (minors).
 July 8, 1960: Pete Rose was signed as an amateur free agent by the Reds.
 July 19, 1960: Brooks Lawrence was released by the Reds.
 August 2, 1960: Marshall Bridges was selected off waivers by the Reds from the St. Louis Cardinals.

Roster

Player stats

Batting

Starters by position 
Note: Pos = Position; G = Games played; AB = At bats; H = Hits; Avg. = Batting average; HR = Home runs; RBI = Runs batted in

Other batters 
Note: G = Games played; AB = At bats; H = Hits; Avg. = Batting average; HR = Home runs; RBI = Runs batted in

Pitching

Starting pitchers 
Note: G = Games pitched; IP = Innings pitched; W = Wins; L = Losses; ERA = Earned run average; SO = Strikeouts

Other pitchers 
Note: G = Games pitched; IP = Innings pitched; W = Wins; L = Losses; ERA = Earned run average; SO = Strikeouts

Relief pitchers 
Note: G = Games pitched; W = Wins; L = Losses; SV = Saves; ERA = Earned run average; SO = Strikeouts

Farm system

References

External links
1960 Cincinnati Reds season at Baseball Reference

Cincinnati Reds seasons
Cincinnati Reds season
Cincinnati Reds